The Minster School is a Church of England secondary school with sixth form in Southwell, Nottinghamshire, England, for children aged 11 to 18. There are approximately 1600 students on roll. It has a small selective junior section (8 years- 11 years) for boy and girl choristers from Southwell Minster and other pupils chosen for their musical ability. It has a smaller than average proportion of pupils on free school meals, or of ethnic minority origin or with Statement of Special Educational Needs.

In December 2011 the School was graded Outstanding by Ofsted, in 30 out of 31 areas.

Admissions
The Minster School is a Church of England school with its roots in the 10th century. It has roughly 1240 pupils in the secondary school (key stage 3 - years 7, 8, 9, 10 and 11) and 400 pupils in the Sixth Form. The attached Minster Junior School provides free education for 40 pupils spanning key stage 2 - years 3, 4, 5 and 6. These children are choristers of Southwell Minster and also other musically gifted pupils. Pupils from the junior school are automatically allocated a year 7 place in the secondary school.  

Canon Blinston was the executive headteacher of the Minster School for 20 years. He served as the Head of Magnus School in Newark, the school with which the Minster School has joined. Mrs White was the head teacher up until December 2013. Mr C. Stevens was the acting head teacher until Matthew Parris joined the school in September 2014.

The school is on Nottingham Road next to Southwell Leisure Centre.

History
The school was founded in 956 and is one of the oldest schools in England, and the 19th oldest school in the world. From a gift of land by King Edwy to Oscytel, Archbishop of York thence was created a Chapter, a Church and a school to teach the singing boys Latin. The earliest named master, in 1313, was Henry de Hykeling. In 1547 the churchwardens petitioned Edward VI "that our Grammar School may also stand with such stipend as appertains the like, wherein our poor youth may be instructed" –  his Commissioners replied "that the school is very meet and necessary to continue". In 1580 Hugh Baskafield, the Master, was discharged by the Chapter as "he had notoriously slacked and neglected his duties" while William Neep  in 1716 ordered the school's rules to be written in English after abolishing the Latin version. 

The 1944 Education Act determined the Governors to seek "Aided Status". The fund-raising at that time suggested that this school's life would run from 956 A.D. to 2956 A.D. Once a selective school, known as Southwell Minster Collegiate Grammar School, and more recently until amalgamation with the local comprehensive known simply as Southwell Minster Grammar School. 

When comparatively small (intake was only about 35 per year during the 1960s), the school was in Minster Chambers, but those premises were vacated in 1964 for a site further down Church Street on the south-eastern side of the Minster. Upon amalgamation, this site, some considerable distance from the Nottingham Road site, became difficult to integrate into the life of the much bigger school. With the decision to concentrate redevelopment at Nottingham Road the Church Street site was sold. As the 1964 premises had been built upon the site of a Roman Villa an opportunity has arisen to restore this location. Amalgamation continued the school's traditional strengths and the school obtained specialist status in music and humanities.

Previously a voluntary aided school, in December 2018 the school converted to academy status.

Buildings
In April 2006, work began on a new £34m school building. On 16 July 2008, Prince Edward, Earl of Wessex officially opened the new school building, in operation since September 2007. The Minster School won the 2009 RIBA Sorrell Foundation Schools Award due  to the highly functional design of the school. It no longer has boarding facilities.

Old Southwellians

 Andrew Cooney, previously the youngest man to walk to the South Pole.
 Paul Franks, cricketer
 Charles Harrison, organist
 Mathew Horne, actor and comedian
 Tom Ryder, rugby player
 Marie Toms, former British Waterski champion
 Hayley Turner, British jockey
 Sian Welby, TV presenter and columnist
 Ben Inman, singer and composer

Southwell Minster Collegiate Grammar School

 Frederick Hutton, scientist
 Henry Fynes Clinton
 Alvin Stardust
 William Hodgson Barrow, Member of Parliament (MP) for South Nottinghamshire 1851–1874.
 The Rev. William Williams.
 Vaughan Grylls, artist and educationalist

References

Notes

Citations

Bibliography

External links
 
 Old Southwellians' Society
 Architects of new buildings
 EduBase
 Most Recent Ofsted Report, Dec. 2011

Choir schools in England
Secondary schools in Nottinghamshire
Church of England secondary schools in the Diocese of Southwell and Nottingham
Primary schools in Nottinghamshire
Academies in Nottinghamshire
Southwell, Nottinghamshire